"The Look of Love" is a song by English pop band ABC, released in 1982 as the third single from their debut studio album, The Lexicon of Love (1982). It was the band's highest charting hit in the UK, peaking at No. 4 on the UK Singles Chart. The single also went to No. 1 on the US Billboard Dance/Disco chart as well as the Canadian Singles Chart. On the American Cash Box Top 100, it got as high as No. 9, and on the Billboard Hot 100 it peaked at No. 18.

History
Released as a single and as a 12" remix, it consists of four parts, referred to as "Parts One, Two, Three and Four". Part One is the standard album version, Part Two is an instrumental version, Part Three is a vocal version without the orchestral overdubs and Part Four is a short acoustic instrumental part of the song, containing strings and horns, as well as occasional harp plucks and xylophone. A different US remix dub version by producer Trevor Horn appeared as A-side on the 1982 US 12".

The '82 US remix dub version was not widely available after its initial release, but the track remained much in demand by club DJs and fans alike and copies of the original 12" version fetched high prices. When Neutron (the band's UK label) discovered this, they issued a limited edition DJ-pressing of the Horn remix in November 1982 as a DJ promo 12" vinyl under the title "ABC Look of Love Special Remix 12" Neutron NTXDJ103.

Through the 1980s, BBC Radio 1 DJ Gary Davies used the last crescendo on Part 4 of the song as a closing theme to his daily lunchtime programme called The Bit in the Middle, only changing it in 1991 when his show was rebranded as Let's Do Lunch and given fresh music beds and themes.

The US B-side, entitled "Theme from Mantrap", was an alternate version of "Poison Arrow".

In February 2014, all four parts appeared together as one single track (running 12:29) on the ZTT compilation "The Art of the 12" Volume Three".

The lyrics of the song, as well as others on The Lexicon of Love, were inspired by a break-up lead vocalist Martin Fry had experienced. In the second verse, during the phrase "When your girl has left you out on the pavement", the "Goodbye" background vocal is spoken by the actual woman in the relationship who had jilted him.

Accolades

(*) indicates the list is unordered.

Charts and certifications

Original release

Weekly charts

Year-end charts

Certifications and sales

1983 re-issue

The Look of Love (1990 Mix)

In 1990, to promote the compilation album Absolutely, a new remix of the song by Paul Staveley O'Duffy was officially released, though without participation or approval from the band's members. The remix incorporates part of the melody from Kraftwerk's "Computer Love", which had been in the UK Top 40 at the same time as the original release of "The Look of Love" in 1982.

Charts

Eclipse versions
In 1996, Australian group, Eclipse released a dance cover version, which reached No. 30 on the Australian charts.

Track listing
 "The Look of Love" – 3:24
 "The Look of Love" (Extended Mix) – 6:41
 "The Look of Love" (Unity Mix) – 5:30
 "The Look of Love" (Bass Of Love Mix)	– 5:00
 "Saviour" (Colombian Mix)	– 4:10
 "Saviour" (Stockholm Mix)	– 5:03

Charts

See also
List of number-one dance singles of 1982 (U.S.)
List of number-one singles of 1982 (Canada)

References

External links
 

1982 songs
1982 singles
1990 singles
ABC (band) songs
Mercury Records singles
Philips Records singles
Phonogram Records singles
PolyGram singles
RPM Top Singles number-one singles
Song recordings produced by Trevor Horn
Songs written by Martin Fry
Songs written by Stephen Singleton
Songs written by Mark White (musician)
Vertigo Records singles